Tyr, in comics, may refer to:

Tyr (Marvel Comics), an Asgardian in Marvel Comics
Tyr, a character in the Danish series Valhalla

See also
Tyr (disambiguation)